Paul Rowley (born 3 June 1963) is a professional English darts player who plays in Professional Darts Corporation events.

He earned a PDC Tour Card in 2011 and 2017, and qualified for the 2009 UK Open, but lost in the third round.

References

External links
Profile and stats on Darts Database

1963 births
Living people
English darts players
Sportspeople from Shrewsbury
Professional Darts Corporation former tour card holders